Samvidhaan: The Making of the Constitution of India is a ten-part television mini-series based on the making of the Constitution of India, directed by Shyam Benegal. The show premiered on 2 March 2014 on Rajya Sabha TV, with an episode scheduled to air every Sunday morning. The series can be viewed on YouTube on Rajya Sabha TV's channel.

Making
Shama Zaidi and Atul Tiwari are writers of the series. Zaidi said that it took her six months to write the script. The material came from debates, committee meetings and biographies of Jawaharlal Nehru and Mahatma Gandhi. Many of the famous speeches of India's freedom fighters figure in the series. Swara Bhaskar has hosted and narrated the show. The series was shot in Film City, Mumbai and recreates the debates that took place before the drafting of the Constitution of India. Dayal Nihalani is the associate director of the mini-series. For the series, a replica of the Central Hall of Parliament during the time of the Constituent Assembly was set up.

The first look of Samvidhaan was unveiled on 24 September 2013. The first look was officially launched on 20 February 2014, the pen-ultimate day of 15th Lok Sabha by President Pranab Mukherjee in Parliament House, New Delhi. Music is composed by Shantanu Moitra.

Episodes

Cast
 Rakesh Pandey as Sachchidananda Sinha
 Sachin Khedekar as Dr. Babasaheb Bhimrao Ambedkar
 Dalip Tahil as Jawaharlal Nehru
 Utkarsh Majumdar as Vallabhbhai Patel
 Tom Alter as Abul Kalam Azad
 Neeraj Kabi as Mahatma Gandhi
 Kaizaad Kotwal as Frank Anthony
 Ivan Rodrigues as P. Subbarayan
 Shyam Kishore	as Lakshmi Narayan Sahu
 Devendra Sharma as Raibahadur Shyam Nandan Sahai
 Ila Arun as Hansa Mehta
 Amit Behl as C. Rajagopalachari
 K. K. Raina as K. M. Munshi
 Rajendra Gupta as Rajendra Prasad
 Aanjjan Srivastav as Bal Krishna Sharma Naveen
 Mohit Chauhan as Brajeshwar Prasad
 Suzanne Bernert as a journalist
 Narendra Jha as Muhammed Ali Jinnah
 Divya Dutta as Purnima Banerjee
 Rajeshwari Sachdev as Rajkumari Amrit Kaur
 Rajit Kapur as Alladi Krishnaswamy Iyer
 Harish Patel as M. A. Ayyangar
 Imran Hasnee as Nawab of Bhopal Hamidullah Khan
 Kenneth Desai as Syama Prasad Mookerjee
 Atul Tiwari as Govind Ballabh Pant
 Deepika Amin as Renuka Ray
 Shiv Kumar Subramaniam as N. Gopalaswami Ayyangar
 Rahul Singh as J. B. Kripalani
 Paresh Ganatra as K. T. Shah
 Kanupriya Shankar Pandit as Sucheta Kriplani
 Akash Khurana as Rohini Kumar Chaudhuri
 Ravi Jhankal as Seth Govind Das
 Salim Ghouse as V. I. Munuswamy Pillai
 Saurabh Dubey (actor) as Mahavir Tyagi
 Vijay Kashyap as B. Pocker Sahib Bahadur
 Amit Singh Thakur as Liaquat Ali
 Himani Shivpuri as Begum Aizaz Rasul
 Lalit Mohan Tiwari as Shibban Lal Saxena
 Natarajan Balkrishna as K. Hanumanthaiah
 Denzil Smith as the Auctioneer
Anil Rastogi as Calcutta MP N. Ahmed
 Narendra Sachar as Khan Abdul Gaffar Khan

Screening
The series was telecasted on Rajya Sabha TV from 2 March 2014 at 10 AM (with repeats at 1PM & 10PM) every Sunday.

See also
 Pradhanmantri
 7 RCR
 List of artistic depictions of Mahatma Gandhi

References

External links
 
YouTube Playlist of Samvidhaan
First look Samvidhaan
Making of Samvidhaan

Hindi-language television shows
Television series set in the 1940s
Indian historical television series
Constitution of India
Indian political television series
Political history of India
2010s Indian television miniseries
2014 Indian television series debuts
2014 Indian television series endings
Cultural depictions of Jawaharlal Nehru
Cultural depictions of Mahatma Gandhi
Cultural depictions of Muhammad Ali Jinnah
Cultural depictions of Vallabhbhai Patel
Cultural depictions of B. R. Ambedkar
Memorials to Abul Kalam Azad
Memorials to C. Rajagopalachari
Ahluwalia
Nawabs of Bhopal
Liaquat Ali Khan
Bahram Khan family
Memorials to Rajendra Prasad